Álamos is a town in Álamos Municipality in the Mexican state of Sonora, in northwestern Mexico.

Historically an important center of silver mining, the town's economy is now dominated by the tourist sector. Designated a pueblo mágico due to its architecture, the town is host to several arts festivals, most notably the Festival Cultural "Alfonso Ortíz Tirado". It also hosts the Alamos Alliance, a yearly summit of economic policy makers, academics and business leaders founded and led by Arnold Harberger that has led to the town being called the "Little Mexican Davos".

Name
Several impressive specimens are found in one of its two principal plazas, the Alameda.

History
The area was named by the conquistador Francisco Vásquez de Coronado. His expedition of 1540 camped at the confluence of the two major arroyos (Escondido and the Aduana) of present-day Álamos and made reference to local geographical landmarks, including two large rock formations on Mount Alamos known as Los Frailes, 'the monks' in English.

As historian David Leighton explained, “Its first known name was Real de los Frailes or “Mining Camp of the Friars,” a designation taken from some tall white rocks that appeared like hooded monks near the village.”

The church records of Álamos date to 1682, but it was founded on December 8, 1685, by the Spanish soldier, Domingo Terán de los Ríos, after the discovery of the silver mines at Promontorios, La Aduana, Las Cabras, La Quintera, and others of lesser importance nearby.  Rios in 1686 became governor of Sonora and Sinaloa, where he was successful in quelling Indian disturbances.

A major expedition led by Juan Bautista de Anza II departed Álamos in 1775 to discover a route to Alta California.  The Anza expedition had nearly 300 members, of which about half were from Álamos.  The trek was financed by the wealthy silver mine owners of Álamos, and it established the Presidio of Monterey.

Álamos became the capital of what was then the state of Occidental in the early 1800s.  Occidental encompassed today's state of Sonora, the northern portion of the state of Sinaloa, and some of Baja California and southern Arizona.  Álamos was the northernmost “Silver City” in Mexico.  While it has much in common, architecturally, with Mexico's other “Silver Cities,” Álamos has not succumbed to large-scale commercialism and has managed to retain the charm and pace of earlier times.

Álamos is known as “La Ciudad de los Portales” (portales are tall, arched, covered verandas or walkways fronting many of the cobble-stoned streets or calles).  Álamos boasts numerous buildings exhibiting classic Andalusian architecture from Mexico's Colonial period, including numerous mansions, the Plaza de Armas, the Church of La Purísima Concepción, La Capilla and the Palacio Municipal (“city hall”).

The great wealth created by the silver mines from the surrounding mining towns of La Aduana, Minas Nuevas, and others enabled the founders and residents of Álamos to build scores of colonial Spanish mansions throughout the town; most of them went into ruin in the early 20th century but in the late 1940s, a number of Americans and Canadians began buying and restoring the houses.

By 1955, the city had electricity running from dusk to about midnight and in 1960 electrical power began to run 24 hours a day, being generated at a dam on a nearby river.

In the 1980s, a study was done by the students at the University of Sinaloa, which caused in 185 structures in town being listed as historic monuments.

The Alamos Alliance was started in 1993 by Arnold Harberger as a small gathering among friends to discuss economic policy.

Geography and climate
The State of Chihuahua is on the east, and the State of Sinaloa on the south.

Álamos has a semi-arid climate (Köppen BSh) bordering on a tropical savanna climate, with three seasons: a hot, dry season from April to June, a hot, humid wet season from July to October, and a warm, generally dry “winter” from November to March. During the hot early summer, temperatures can reach extreme heights; the record being  on 16 June 1976.

Economy

After a heyday lasting from the late 1600s until the early 1900s, when the silver mines closed, the economy of Alamos went into a serious decline.  Only a few hundred people remained in the once vibrant city due to a major decline in silver prices, ongoing unrest in the country with a revolution in progress, and the exodus of business owners and people of wealth. Vacant mansions went into disrepair until foreigners began restoring homes in 1946 after three decades of abandonment, bringing employment to locals with building and housekeeping skills.  The area's top industries for decades were ranching and tourism. The present-day economy includes copper and silver mines. About 16 km to the northwest is the Adolfo Ruiz Cortinez Dam and Reservoir known as “El Mocúzarit”, whose waters irrigate . Cattle ranching is seasonal and declining due to impoverished grazing lands. Numerous chicken and pig farms, called “granjas,” contribute substantially to the economy.

Tourism
Álamos was named a “Pueblo Mágico” in 2005. “Pueblo Magico” is a designation given by the Mexican Secretariat of Tourism to towns that offer a 'magical' experience by reason of their natural beauty, cultural riches and historical relevance.

Álamos has many festivals and fiestas year-round.  Most notable is the Festival of Dr. Alfonso Ortiz Tirado (“FAOT”), attended by many national and international musicians and celebrities. Dr. Alfonso Ortiz Tirado, born in this community in 1894, achieved recognition for being “El Tenor de las Américas.” An impressive exhibit of Ortiz Tirado is found in the Museo Costumbrista, located in front of and to the east of the Plaza de Armas. The annual Festival Alfonso Ortiz Tirado is a nine-day event that takes places in Álamos annually in late January.  The annual film festival is usually held in March.  Several professional hunting lodges operate in the Alamos area, attracting dove hunters from various areas of the world. Álamos has more recently been the location for film production, including a European Endemol production and more than 180 episodes of the 'novela' (soap opera) La Fuerza del Destino

The Sierra de Álamos–Río Cuchujaqui Biosphere Reserve offers serious “birding” opportunities. The creek of Cuchujaqui, which is in the ecological reserve is the most species-rich subtropical area in the Northern Hemisphere. Cuchujaqui is the subject of international scientific study and the southern migration destination of hundreds of different species of birds.

The presence of a jet-rated airport in Alamos (XALA) attracts aviators from Mexico, the U.S. and Canada.  There is also charter service available to some areas of the Copper Canyon. The village has more than 20 hotels and B&B's.

Government
You can see a list of municipal presidents of Álamos

Notable residents
María Félix, film actress
Gloria Fonda, silent film actress (died in Álamos in 1978)
Arturo Márquez, composer
Alfonso Ortiz Tirado, physician, tenor, and philanthropist
Félix María Zuloaga, former President of Mexico
Carroll O'Connor, actor
Geraldine Page, Oscar-winning actress
Rip Torn, Emmy-winning actor
Álvaro Obregón, a general in the Mexican Revolution and President of Mexico
José Vicente Feliz, early settler of Los Angeles and namesake of Los Feliz, born in Álamos around 1741 
David Zepeda, actor

Sister cities 

 Scottsdale, Arizona, United States

Planet Mars 
The name Álamos has been used for a crater on the planet Mars by the International Astronomical Union, although not specifically commemorating the town.

References

External links 

 H. Ayuntamiento de Álamos (Official WebSite of Álamos, Sonora)
 Turismo Sonora
 Álamos Sonora Mexico ©2010 – 2018 Anders Tomlinson, all rights reserved.
 Álamos Sonora Mexico Expatriate Community Forum

Populated places in Sonora
Mining communities in Mexico
Pueblos Mágicos
Populated places established in the 17th century
World Heritage Tentative List for Mexico